Joanna Patricia Toch (born 13 October 1961) is a British Olympian and a practising barrister.

Sporting career

Toch rowed for Great Britain in the 1979 World Rowing Junior Championships, 1980 Moscow Olympic Games (she was the youngest member of the Great Britain team), the 1984 Los Angeles Olympic Games, the 1986 Commonwealth Games and six World Rowing Championships between 1981 and 1990. She was part of the eight, that won the national title rowing for Great Britain senior squad boat, at the 1981 National Championships and was part of the eight that won the national title, rowing for an A.R.A Composite, at the 1982 National Rowing Championships.

She won both the coxed four and lightweight coxless four national titles at the 1989 National Championships and won a silver medal at the 1989 World Rowing Championships in Bled, in the lightweight coxless four event. She was in the first women's crew to row at Henley Royal Regatta.

After finishing her own competitive rowing, Toch became a Junior Rowing coach. Toch now rows for Ardingly Rowing Club. In 2015, she won a number of domestic Masters events and competed in the 2015 World Masters Rowing Championships. In 2016, she was in the Ardingly crew that won the Women's Eights Head of the River small clubs pennant, she won the pairs event at Master's Henley and won in the women's Masters eight at the Masters World Championships in Copenhagen.

Legal career
Toch received a degree in law from King's College London and was called to the Bar in 1988. She undertook a criminal pupillage at the Chambers of Ann Goddard QC and then worked in her own name until 1990 when she became a lecturer at the Inns of Court School of Law. In 1992, Toch returned to practice and undertook a civil pupillage and began to do a mix of civil and criminal work. In 2002, she began work in a solicitor's practice in London, moving on in 2007 to work in the family department of a solicitor's firm in Kent.

In October 2009, she resumed practice at the Bar continuing to specialise in all aspects of family work, and in 2015 she moved to Church Court Chambers, headed by Kerim Fuad QC, to join the family team.

In 2017, Toch founded Familylawcafe.co.uk.

Toch takes family law cases on a direct access basis and is listed on a directory service for barristers called mybarrister.com 

Toch, in line with the work of most family law barristers, has given talks on financial aspects of divorce and on the law in cases of domestic violence.

Racism controversy
On 7 June 2021, Toch was ostensibly suspended from her role at Family Law Cafe, despite being the firm's founder and director, due to comments she made on Twitter regarding Lilibet Mountbatten-Windsor, the newborn daughter of the Duke and Duchess of Sussex. In response to a tweet by journalist Julie Burchill, who stated: "What a missed opportunity. They could have called it Georgina Floydina!" (in reference to George Floyd), Toch replied: "No Doria? Don't black names matter?" (in reference to the Duchess's mother Doria Ragland and the Black Lives Matter movement). In a statement confirming her suspension, her "employer" referred to her comments as "offensive and unacceptable". The Head of Church Court Chambers, Toch's previous employer, also issued a statement confirming that, despite the information contained within her Wikipedia article, they have no association with her and that she left her role in 2018; they stated: "Church Court Chambers pride ourselves on our diverse membership: there is no place for racism in any context anywhere”. On 8 June 2021, the Family Law Bar Association (FLBA), the association for family law barristers, issued a statement that they have referred the twitter exchanges to the Bar Standards Board, the Bar Council and other relevant bodies, and that they condemn the comments as being "completely inappropriate" and having "no place in our society", and that "racism of any kind cannot be tolerated and cannot be justified as a 'joke'". The regulator Bar Standards Board decided to take no action in relation to the matter.

Recent reported decisions
Toch has been involved in a few reported cases in family law:

 Hubbard and Scott [2011] EWHC 2750 (Ch)
 Rana v Manan (validity of foreign marriage) 2011 AER (D) 179 (May) 
 S (A Child) [2012] EWCA Civ 1031 
 Chiva v Chiva [2014] EWCA Civ 1558

References

External links
Family Law Bar Association
Resolution

1961 births
Living people
English barristers
People from Carshalton
Alumni of King's College London
English female rowers
Olympic rowers of Great Britain
Rowers at the 1980 Summer Olympics
Rowers at the 1984 Summer Olympics
Members of Leander Club
Commonwealth Games competitors for England
Rowers at the 1986 Commonwealth Games
British women lawyers
World Rowing Championships medalists for Great Britain